Najwa Kawar Farah,  (1923 - August 2015) is a Palestinian educator and writer.

She was born Najwa Kawar in Nazareth and was educated there, later attending the Teachers' Academy in Jerusalem. She taught school in Nazareth. She married Reverend Rafiq Farah in 1950; the couple produced the magazine al-Ra'id in 1967. Farah also wrote articles for the press and for radio. She lived in Haifa until the mid-1960s, when she left the region.

The family moved to Jerusalem in 1965, then to Beirut in 1977 and to London in 1986. Since 1998, they have been living in Scarborough in Ontario, Canada.

Selected works 
 'Abiru al-sabil (The passersby), short stories (1954)
 Durub masabih (Lamp paths), short stories (1956)
 Mudhakkirat rihla (Memoirs of journey), autobiography (1957)
 Sirr Shahrazad (Sheherazade's secret), play (1958)
 Malik al-majd (King of glory), play (1961)
 Li-man al-rabi'? (Who owns spring), short stories (1963)
 Silsilat qisas li-I-ashbal (A series of stories for young ones), children's literature (1963–65), 3 volumes
 Intifadat al- 'asafir (The sparrow's uprising), short stories (1991)
 Sukkan al-tabiq al- 'ulwi (The people upstairs), novel (1996)

References

External links 
 
 

1923 births
2015 deaths
Palestinian short story writers
Palestinian dramatists and playwrights
Palestinian women writers
Palestinian Christians
20th-century Palestinian women writers
20th-century Palestinian writers
21st-century Palestinian women writers
21st-century Palestinian writers
Palestinian expatriates in Lebanon
Palestinian expatriates in the United Kingdom
Palestinian expatriates in Canada